Udine railway station serves the city and comune of Udine, in the autonomous region of Friuli-Venezia Giulia, northeastern Italy.  Opened in 1860, it is a junction of five lines, to Venice, Trieste, Tarvisio, Cervignano and Cividale, respectively.

The station is currently managed by Rete Ferroviaria Italiana (RFI).  However, the commercial area of the passenger building is managed by Centostazioni.  Each of these companies is a subsidiary of Ferrovie dello Stato (FS), Italy's state-owned rail company. Train services to and from the station are operated by Trenitalia, ÖBB and Ferrovie Udine-Cividale.

Location
Udine railway station is situated in Viale Europa Unita, at the southern edge of the city centre.

History
Only a few months later, on 3 October 1860, it also became the terminus of the Udine–Trieste railway, in conjunction with the opening of the Cormons–Udine section of that line.

Under the management of Centostazioni, the passenger building underwent a restoration and renovation completed in 2005. The construction work focused on the modernization of the main hall, the construction of a new ticket office and the new information centre. In addition, some spaces were created for commercial use.

Features

The station has a large passenger building that houses many services, including ticketing, two newsagents, bars, a bank, a chapel, a pharmacy, the shops, the Eurostar Club and the headquarters of the Railway Police.

In addition, there are offices of Trenitalia and the station manager. At one time the station was also the home of a military command.

The station yard is equipped with 7 tracks for passenger service (numbered 1 to 8), plus a few tracks for the exclusive use of freight handling, shunting, stabling and storage, including track number 2 which has no platform.

Up to 1 December 2008, the station was equipped with a locomotive shed and workshops.

Passenger and train movements
The movement of passengers at the station is about 7.6 million people a year, which means that the station is the busiest in Friuli-Venezia Giulia in terms of numbers of passengers.

In the station, there are all types of trains for different destinations.

Directly outside the station, in the square, are bus stops for all bus routes to Udine. A few hundred metres away is the bus station, which is a terminus for suburban services. In front of the station is a taxi stand.

Train services
The station is served by the following service(s):

High speed services (Frecciarossa) Udine - Treviso - Venice - Padua - Bologna - Florence - Rome
High speed services (Frecciarossa) Udine - Treviso - Venice - Padua - Verona - Milan
High speed services (Railjet) Vienna - Klagenfurt - Villach - Udine - Treviso - Venice
Night train (CityNightLine) Munich - Tarvisio - Udine - Treviso - Venice
Night train (EuroNight) Vienna - Linz - Salzburg - Villach - Udine - Treviso - Venice
Night train (Intercity Notte) Trieste - Udine - Venice - Padua - Bologna - Rome
Express services (Regionale Veloce) Trieste - Gorizia - Udine - Treviso - Venice
Regional services (Treno regionale) Trieste - Gorizia - Udine - Treviso - Venice
Regional services (REX) Villach - Tarvisio - Carnia - Gemona del Friuli - Udine
Regional services (Treno regionale) Tarvisio - Carnia - Gemona del Friuli - Udine - Cervignano del Friuli - Trieste
Local services (Treno regionale) Udine - Cividale del Friuli

See also

History of rail transport in Italy
List of railway stations in Friuli-Venezia Giulia
Rail transport in Italy
Railway stations in Italy

References

External links

History and pictures of Udine railway station 

This article is based upon a translation of the Italian language version as at December 2010.

Railway station
Railway stations in Friuli-Venezia Giulia
Railway stations opened in 1860